Malpighia coccigera is a species of flowering plant in the family Malpighiaceae, that is native to the Caribbean. It is commonly known as Singapore holly or dwarf holly due to the shape of its leaves, but is not a true holly (genus Ilex). Its white flowers are followed by red berries, which are technically drupes. The fruit are favorite by birds that disperse the seeds through droppings. It is grown as an ornamental plant and often used to make bonsai.

References

External links

Malpighia coccigera information
Malpighia coccigera information

coccigera
Plants described in 1753
Taxa named by Carl Linnaeus
Flora of the Caribbean
Flora without expected TNC conservation status